Christopher Lindquist (born 30 October 1995) is a Norwegian professional footballer who plays for  Lyn, as a full-back.

He was released from Strømsgodset after the 2019 season.

References

1995 births
Living people
Norwegian footballers
Strømsgodset Toppfotball players
Hønefoss BK players
Florø SK players
Kristiansund BK players
KFUM-Kameratene Oslo players
Lyn Fotball players
Eliteserien players
Norwegian First Division players
Association football defenders